La poliziotta a New York (internationally released as A Policewoman in New York) is a 1981 commedia sexy all'italiana directed by Michele Massimo Tarantini. It is the final chapter in the "poliziotta" trilogy directed by Tarantini and starred by Edwige Fenech, with the first two films being Confessions of a Lady Cop (La poliziotta fa carriera, 1976) and A Policewoman on the Porno Squad (La poliziotta della squadra del buon costume, 1979).

Cast 
Edwige Fenech: Gianna Amicucci/La Pupa
Alvaro Vitali: Alvaro Tarallo/Joe Dodiciomicidi 
Aldo Maccione: Big John
Renzo Montagnani: Mac Caron
Giacomo Rizzo: Il Turco
Enzo Andronico: the teacher of dialect
Fidel Mbanga-Bauna: Gedeone

References

External links

1981 films
Commedia sexy all'italiana
Poliziotta films
1980s police comedy films
1980s sex comedy films
Films directed by Michele Massimo Tarantini
Films set in Italy
Films set in New York (state)
Films scored by Berto Pisano
1981 comedy films
1980s Italian-language films
1980s Italian films